Sramko (Archaic: Срамько) or Hramko, was a knez (nobleman) in the Trebinje province believed to have been active during the Nemanjić dynasty (1166–1371).

An inscription found by scholar S. Delić near the Church of St. Peter in the locality of Crnče near Trebinje reading "Poleta, Drougan and Dražeta buried their mother in the days of glorious Duke Sramko", was published in 1913 (Delić had likely found it in the winter of 1912 or early 1913). Grave tablets were unearthed while digging the base for the new church. The grave tablet mentioning Sramko was unearthed by the western wall of the nave of the church, some 40 cm below surface, with a part of it set in the base of the church. The dimensions of the tablet were 130×80 cm. V. Ćorović, writing in 1925, proposed that the unusual name Sramko was to be read as Hramko (Храмько). M. Vego, too, read it as Hramko, and believed that he was an important person, even more so than Grd. Vego believed that he lived during the Nemanjić period, after ousting knez Mihailo from the Trebinje province.

In a Latin donation charter, a Chrance, rendered Hranko (Хранко) or Hramko, has been connected by some scholars to Sramko. The text mentions "The seal of Hranko and all župani of Zahumlje" (Sigillum Chrance cum omnibus suis iupanis Zacholmie). F. Šišić however disputed this, as he regarded the donation charter a falsification as is generally held against several alleged 12th- and 13th-century donation charters, including Desa's alleged 1151 charter that dates to the 13th century.

References

Sources
 
 

12th-century Serbian nobility
People from Trebinje
Medieval Herzegovina
12th-century births
Year of birth unknown
Year of death unknown
Place of birth unknown
Place of death unknown